"Girl Talk" is the first single by Swedish pop and R&B music singer Dhani Lennevald, the single was released on September 2004 in Sweden.

Although, the low chart position, the song was very popular in his native Sweden, where it peaked at No. 20 on the Single Charts earning a gold certification for more than 10,000 copies sold of the physical single.

"Girl Talk" spent 9 weeks inside the Swedish Top 60.

Music video
The video for "Girl Talk" was filmed in Stockholm, Sweden on August 17 & 18, and was premiered on September 16 on Swedish Channel TV4.

The video shows Dhani in different places of the city, trying to understand the 'Girl Talks'.

In an attempt to quit the "A*Teens Boy" Image, sexy images of him and a girl were shown on the video, but this failed to get the public's attention. The music video had respectable rotation on Swedish music channels.

The version of the song used on the video, was featuring Nik & Jay, they also appeared on the video.

Track listing
Swedish CD Single
"Girl Talk" Radio Version – 2:58
"Girl Talk" Active Cut A Rug Remix – 3:39

Swedish CD Maxi
"Girl Talk" Radio Version – 2:58
"Girl Talk" Featuring Nik & Jay – 2:58
"Girl Talk" Featuring Mighty 44 – 2:58
"Girl Talk" Antiloop Remix – 5:06

Charts

Certifications and sales

References

2004 singles
2004 songs
Universal Music Group singles
English-language Swedish songs